Thomas Marion Jett (May 1, 1862 – January 10, 1939) was a U.S. Representative from Illinois.

Born near Greenville, Illinois, Jett attended the common schools and the Northern Indiana Normal School, Valparaiso, Indiana, for two years. He taught school in Bond and Montgomery Counties, Illinois. He studied law. He was admitted to the bar in 1887 and commenced practice in Nokomis, Illinois. He moved to Hillsboro, Illinois, and served as prosecuting attorney of Montgomery County 1889-1896.

Jett was elected as a Democrat to the Fifty-fifth, Fifty-sixth, and Fifty-seventh Congresses (March 4, 1897 – March 3, 1903). He was not a candidate for renomination in 1902. He resumed the practice of law in Hillsboro, Illinois. He was also interested in agricultural pursuits. He served as a delegate to the Democratic National Conventions in 1900 and 1908. He was elected as a judge of the circuit court, fourth judicial district of Illinois, in 1909. He was reelected in 1915, 1921, 1927, and 1935 and served until his death. He was a member of the appellate court of the second district of Illinois 1922-1936. He died in Litchfield, Illinois, January 10, 1939. He was interred in Oak Grove Cemetery, Hillsboro, Illinois.

References

External links
 Thomas M. Jett Historical Society of Montgomery County Illinois

1862 births
1939 deaths
Judges of the Illinois Appellate Court
People from Litchfield, Illinois
Democratic Party members of the United States House of Representatives from Illinois
People from Greenville, Illinois
People from Hillsboro, Illinois
People from Nokomis, Illinois